The 18th Mieczysław Połukard Criterium of Polish Speedway League Aces was the 1999 version of the Mieczysław Połukard Criterium of Polish Speedway Leagues Aces. It took place on March 28 in the Polonia Stadium in Bydgoszcz, Poland.

Starting positions draw 

 Roman Jankowski - Unia Leszno
 Jacek Gollob - Ludwik-Polonia Piła
 Sebastian Ułamek - Lotos-Wybrzeże Gdańsk
 Robert Dados - Kunterszyn-Roleski Grudziądz
 Piotr Protasiewicz - Jutrzenka-Polonia Bydgoszcz
 Robert Sawina - Trilux-Start Gniezno
 Rafał Dobrucki - Ludwik-Polonia Piła
 Piotr Świst - KKER-Stal Rzeszów
 Mirosław Kowalik - Apator-Netia Toruń
 Rafał Okoniewski - Pergo Gorzów Wlkp.
 Tomasz Gollob - Jutrzenka-Polonia Bydgoszcz
 Grzegorz Walasek - ZKŻ Polmos Zielona Góra
 Wiesław Jaguś - Apator-Netia Toruń
 Jacek Krzyżaniak - Atlas Wrocław
 Przemysław Tajchert - Jutrzenka-Polonia Bydgoszcz
 Tomasz Bajerski - Pergo Gorzów Wlkp.
 (R1) Tomasz Poprawski - Jutrzenka-Polonia Bydgoszcz
 (R2) Michał Robacki - Jutrzenka-Polonia Bydgoszcz

Heat details

Sources 
 Roman Lach - Polish Speedway Almanac

See also 

Criterium of Aces
Mieczysław Połukard Criterium of Polish Speedway Leagues Aces
1999 in Polish speedway